Gurnard's Head (meaning desolate one) is a prominent headland on the north coast of the Penwith peninsula in Cornwall, England, UK. The name is supposed to reflect that the rocky peninsula resembles the head of the gurnard fish.

Geography and geology
Gurnard's Head is the site of basaltic pillow lavas, formed by underwater volcanic eruptions up to 400 million years ago.

It is north of the hamlet of Treen in the parish of Zennor, one mile to the west of Zennor Head. Almost entirely owned by the National Trust, the headland is within the Aire Point to Carrick Du SSSI, and the  South West Coast Path crosses the southern part of the headland. The area is designated as part of the Penwith Heritage Coast and also designated as part of the Cornwall Area of Outstanding Natural Beauty. A pub and hotel on the B3306 coast road shares a name with the headland.

History

The headland is the site of an Iron Age promontory fort known as Trereen Dinas (not to be confused with Treryn Dinas). On the cliff-edge, above Treen Cove are the remains of Chapel Jane, which could have been a guild chapel of local fisherman. The earliest pottery dates from AD 1100 to 1150, but the original simple structure of the chapel is comparable with the tiny chapels of St Helen's and Teän, on the Isles of Scilly. An association with the adjoining stream which according to local, 19th-century, tradition was regarded as a holy well, could indicate an earlier, possibly 8th-century founding.

To the east of the headland is an engine house belonging to a copper mine, originally known as Treen Copper Mine (before 1821) and later renamed Gurnard's Head Mine.

There are two small coves to the east of, and sheltered by Gurnard's Head; Treen Cove and Rose-an-Hale Cove. In 1870 the Gurnard's Head seine fishery was worth an estimated £800 per year and employed twenty-four men with ten boats and two seines. The pilchards (Sardina pilchardus) were sold locally as fresh pilchards rather than salted and sold as fumadoes for the Mediterranean market. The Western Fishing Company was dissolved and their assets were auctioned on Monday, 28 June 1880. Included were the Account-house furniture, cellars, lofts and buildings used in the pilchard fishery as well as a launching platform in the cove. There were fourteen boats (senn boats, loaders and followers), a capstan, chain blocks and gear, large crane, stage and winch, two seans (seines nets), tuck net and stop net, circa 50 tons of French salt, etc.

The headland was popular with tourists' during Queen Victoria's reign. The freehold of the Gurnard's Head Inn was put up for sale by auction on Thursday, 27 May 1880, at the Western Hotel, Penzance. The reserve was £975 and the highest bid was £730 and the property was not sold.

References

External links

 Trereen Dinas promontory fort site page on  The Megalithic Portal
 Gurnard's Head cliff fort site page on The Modern Antiquarian
 The Gurnard's Head pub

Headlands of Cornwall
Hill forts in Cornwall
Iron Age sites in Cornwall
National Trust properties in Cornwall
Zennor